Waterlooville F.C. was an English football club based in Waterlooville, Hampshire. They were known as "The Ville" and played at Jubilee Park in Aston Road. They ceased to exist in 1998 when they merged with Havant Town to form Havant & Waterlooville.

History
The club was established in 1902 and initially played in the Waterlooville and District League. Shortly before World War II they joined the Portsmouth League, immediately winning the Division Three title. After the war they won Division Two and after a few years in Division One they won the title three times in a row. In 1953 they joined the Hampshire League and in 1968–69 reached the first round of the FA Cup for the first time, where they lost 2–1 to Kettering Town.

In 1971 the club were promoted to Division One South of the Southern League. They won the division in their first season and were promoted to the Premier Division. However, they finished bottom of the Premier Division the following season and were relegated back to Division One South. In 1976–77 they reached the first round of the FA Cup again, losing 2–1 at home to Wycombe Wanderers in a match which set the Jubilee Park attendance record of 4,500. When the league was reorganised in 1982 they were placed in the Premier Division, but were relegated back to Division One South in 1982–83, despite also reaching the final of the Southern League Cup, losing to Alvechurch. The following season, under the stewardship of manager John Milkins, they again reached the first round of the FA Cup, holding Northampton Town to two 1–1 draws, before losing a second replay 2–0.

Ville lifted the Southern League Cup in 1986–87 after winning both legs of the two-legged final against Hednesford Town. The following season they finished second and were promoted back to the Premier Division. In 1988–89 they reached the first round of the FA Cup for the fourth and final time, losing 4–1 at home to Aylesbury United. They remained in the Premier Division until relegation at the end of the 1993–94 season. In 1998 the club merged with Havant Town to form Havant & Waterlooville. Residential housing, known as Coronation Road, was built on the site of Jubilee Park. The rows of poplar trees which marked the southern and western boundaries of the football ground remain.

Honours
Southern League
Division One South champions 1971–72
League Cup runners-up 1982–83
League Cup winners 1986–87
Southern Division runners-up 1987–88

Former players
Notable former players include three who went on to play professional football in England, Paul Hardyman (transferred to Portsmouth in 1983), Guy Whittingham (to Portsmouth via Yeovil Town in 1989) and Paul Moody (to Southampton in 1991). Additionally, several players joined Ville after a professional career, including Vince Hilaire, Billy Gilbert, Joe Laidlaw and Gary Stanley. Calvin Hore holds the club record for player appearances, with 801. He made his debut, aged 16, in September 1980, and aside from one season on the books of Portsmouth (1981–82), was a regular first team member until the club played its last match in May 1998. He was also club captain for most of the 1990s.

References

Association football clubs established in 1902
Association football clubs disestablished in 1998
Defunct football clubs in England
Football clubs in Hampshire
1998 disestablishments in England
1902 establishments in England
Portsmouth Saturday Football League
Hampshire League
Southern Football League clubs